The Sacramento City Council is the governing body of the city of Sacramento, California. The council holds regular meetings at Sacramento City Hall on Tuesdays at 6:00 pm, with exceptions for holidays and other special cases.

Sacramento's city council is a nine-member mayor-council system of government. The council is composed of a mayor and eight council members, each of whom is elected to four-year terms from their respective districts. Sacramento's government is a "weak mayor" system in that the council retains executive and legislative authority. The management and operations of city affairs are not under the direct control of the mayor or the council; these matters are delegated to a city manager, who is appointed by Sacramento's Mayor and serves at the pleasure of the council.

History

Previous councils 
Sacramento, the oldest incorporated city in the State of California, has been governed by a council since the city's citizens approved a city charter in 1849. This charter, known as the "City Charter of 1850" in reference to the year that the charter was recognized by the California State Legislature, provided for the election of a ten-member "Common Council" made up of a Mayor and nine council members.

In 1858, the governments of Sacramento County and the City of Sacramento merged. As a result, Sacramento was governed by the Sacramento County Board of Directors (a predecessor to the Sacramento County Board of Supervisors) for the next five years.

The revised City Charter of 1863 returned to a separate governing body for the City of Sacramento. The charter established a four-member "Board of Trustees" composed of a Mayor and three trustees. Two more trustees were added to the board under the provisions of the City Charter of 1891. Later, in the City Charter of 1912, the five members of the city's governing body were renamed to "City Commissioners".

Revisions made in the City Charter of 1921 established a nine-member governing body, composed of a Mayor and eight council members. The charter established the group's current nomenclature, the "City Council". Councilmembers were elected via a preferential voting system, in which all of Sacramento's electorate were allowed to vote for multiple candidates. Once elected, the council selected one of the councilmembers to serve a two-year term as the city's mayor.

Present council format 
Since 1971, the city has been divided into eight council districts. Each district's boundaries are created using data from the United States Census so that each district contains a relatively equal number of citizens. Councilmembers, who must be residents of the districts that they are elected to, are selected by the voters of their respective districts for four-year terms. Unlike the previous system, the city's voters elect the city's mayor to a four-year term via a popular vote.

From the time that the district-based city council was established in 1971, the citizens of Sacramento have considered charters that proposed to consolidate the governments of Sacramento County and the City of Sacramento. On both occasions, in 1974 and again in 1990, the ballot measures were rejected by the citizens of both municipalities.

In 1971, all the seats were up for election as the district format was used for the first time. As a result, councilmembers in odd numbered districts were elected to 6-year terms in 1971 that ended in 1977. Councilmembers in even numbered districts who were elected in 1987 and councilmembers in odd numbered districts that were elected in 1989 were elected to 5-year terms that ended in November of 1992 and November of 1994 as the city switched to even year elections following those elections.

Council Districts 
Sacramento's city district boundaries are defined in an effort to distribute the city's population evenly, as required by state and federal law. District boundaries are redrawn based on data from the United States Census. In April 2022, questions were raised when the City Attorney published an opinion stating that the City had incorrectly assigned constituencies in new districts to sitting councilmembers in the period between redistricting and elections, and that sitting councilmembers should instead represent the constituencies that originally elected them.

District 1 

Sacramento's District 1 is located in the northwestern area of the city. District 1's neighborhoods include: 
North Natomas

Councilmember Angelique Ashby represents District 1 of the City of Sacramento. She is a small business owner and a resident of North Natomas. Ashby is an alumnus of University of California, Davis and earned a Juris Doctor degree from McGeorge School of Law.

District 2 

District 2 is located in the northeastern area of Sacramento. The district includes the neighborhoods of:
Arden Fair
Ben Ali
Cannon Industrial Park
Del Paso Heights
Erikson Industrial Park
Glenwood Meadows
Hagginwood
Noralto
North Sacramento
Parker Homes
Robla
Strawberry Manor
Swanston Estates
Woodlake
Youngs Heights

In November 2012, Allen Warren narrowly defeated former Councilmember Rob Kerth to win the council seat. Warren, a former stockbroker and founder of a local real estate development company, holds a Bachelor's degree in Political Science from California State University, East Bay.

District 3 

District 3 covers the northern central area of Sacramento. Neighborhoods in District 3 include:
Cal Expo
CSUS
Downtown Railyards
Dos Rios Triangle
East Sacramento
Gardenland
Northgate
Point West
River District
River Park
South Natomas

Councilman Jeff Harris was elected to the Sacramento City Council in 2014. He has owned Cadence Construction since 1982. He was a city Parks and Recreation Commissioner for 4 years. He is a resident of the River Park neighborhood.

District 4 

Sacramento's District 4 is located in the western central area of the city. District 4 neighborhoods include:
Alhambra Triangle 
Downtown
Freeport Manor
Land Park
Little Pocket
Mangan Park
Mansion Flats
Marshall School
Midtown
New Era Park
Newton Booth
Poverty Ridge
Richmond Grove
South Land Park
Southside Park
Upper Land Park
Winn Park/Capitol Avenue

Councilmember Katie Valenzuela defeated Steve Hansen in the March 2020 Primary. Katie is a small business owner working to support environmental justice groups working on state policy, and received her bachelors and masters degree in Community Development from the University of California at Davis.

District 5 

District 5 is located in the southern central area of Sacramento. Neighborhoods in District 5 include 
Airport (Executive)
Brentwood
Carleton Tract
Colonial Heights
Curtis Park
Freeport Manor
Golf Course Terrace
Hollywood Park
Lawrence Park
Mangan Park
Med Center
North City Farms
Oak Park (North Oak Park, Central Oak Park, & South Oak Park)
SCC
South City Farms
Woodbine
Z'Berg Park

Councilmember Jay Schenirer represents District 5 of the City of Sacramento. He works as an independent consultant and policy advisor on education reform and youth policy and strategies. Schenirer is an alumnus of University of California, San Diego and earned a Masters of Public Affairs at University of Texas at Austin.

District 6 

District 6 is in Sacramento's southeastern central area. The district includes the neighborhoods of:
Avondale
Campus Commons
College/Glen
Colonial Village
Colonial Manor
Elmhurst
Fruitridge Manor 
Glen Elder 
Granite Regional Park
Sierra Oaks
Southeast Village 
Tahoe Park (Tahoe Park proper, West Tahoe Park, Tahoe Park East, & Tahoe Park South) 
Tallac Village
The district previously included UC Davis Medical Center, however this area was removed through a mid-decade redistricting.

Eric Guerra represents the district on the City Council. An alumnus of California State University, Sacramento, where he earned a Masters in Public Policy and Administration and Bachelors of Science, and later served as Preside of the Alumni Association, Guerra served as a Chief of Staff in the California State Legislature before being elected to the council.

Kevin McCarty represented District 6 of the City of Sacramento until he was elected to the California State Assembly in November 2014. He had been a member of the City Council since 2004 when he was elected to replace Dave Jones who was running for a seat in the California State Assembly. His is an alumnus of California State University, Long Beach and Cal State Sacramento where he earned a Masters in Public Policy and Administration, McCarty served as policy director to then Lieutenant Governor Cruz Bustamante prior to being elected to the council.

District 7 

Sacramento's District 7 is located in the southwestern area of the city. Its neighborhoods include: 
Greenhaven 
Meadowview (southern portion) 
Pocket
Valley Hi

Councilmember Rick Jennings represents District 7 of the City of Sacramento. Councilmember Jennings is an alumnus of the University of Maryland and won a Super Bowl with the Oakland Raiders.

His predecessor is Darrell Fong who stepped down to run for California State Assembly. A retired Sacramento Police Department Captain, Fong is an alumnus of California State University, Sacramento.

District 8 

District 8 is located in Sacramento's southern area. District 8 neighborhoods include: 
Meadowview (northern portion) 
North Laguna

Councilmember Mai Vang represents District 8 of the City of Sacramento.

Her predecessor is Larry Carr.

Past Councils & Councilmembers

Past City Councils (1971 election - present)

Notable Councilmembers 
Past Sacramento City Councilmembers with notable achievements include:
 Former City Commissioner of Education Luella Johnston (1912-1913), the first woman to be elected to the Sacramento City Council and to any municipal office in California.
 The late Congressman Robert Matsui, who served 26 years in the United States House of Representatives.
 Current Mayor of Sacramento and former California State Senate Pro Tem Darrell Steinberg, the first leader of the California State Senate from Sacramento since 1882.
 Former California Assemblymember Phillip Isenberg, Sacramento's Mayor for 6 years before serving 14 years in the California State Assembly.
 Former California Secretary of Health and Human Services Grantland Johnson, who also served as a Regional Director of the U.S. Department of Health and Human Services in the Clinton Administration and as a member of the Sacramento County Board of Supervisors.
 U.S. Federal District Judge Kimberly J. Mueller, the second woman appointed to the Sacramento Division of the United States District Court for the Eastern District of California, and the first woman to serve that district as a federal judge.
 Sacramento County Superior Court Judge Lloyd G. Connelly, who followed his time on the Council with a 10-year term in the California State Assembly.
 Former California Assemblymember and Senator Deborah Ortiz, who served 10 years in the California State Legislature.
 Former Sacramento Mayor Belle Cooledge, the first woman to serve as Mayor of Sacramento.
 Former Sacramento Mayor Anne Rudin, the first woman to be elected Mayor of Sacramento.
 The late former Sacramento Mayor Joe Serna, the first Latino to be elected Mayor of Sacramento.
 Former Sacramento Mayor Heather Fargo.
 Former California Insurance Commissioner and Former Assemblymember Dave Jones.
 Former Sacramento County Supervisor and Former Mayor Jimmie Yee.

See also
Mayor of Sacramento, California

Notes 
 Elected via a special election to complete the remainder of the previous council member's term.
 Resigned prior to the end of their council term after being elected to another office (e.g. Mayor, State Assembly, County Board of Supervisors, etc.).
 Appointed to complete the remainder of the previous council member's term.
 Died in office.
 Retired.

References

External links
City of Sacramento: Office of the Mayor and City Council
City of Sacramento: City Maps: Council Districts (in effect October 06 2011)
City of Sacramento: City Maps: Council Districts (to take effect mid-December 2022)
City of Sacramento Charter

Government of Sacramento, California
California city councils